is a Japanese anime series written and directed by Junichi Sato. The initial four-episode original video animation (OVA) series was produced by Hal Film Maker and released over two Blu-ray Disc and DVD volumes in November and December 2010. A 12-episode anime television series produced by TYO Animations, titled Tamayura: Hitotose, aired in Japan between October and December 2011. A second TV anime season, Tamayura: More Aggressive, aired between July and September 2013. A four-part animated film series, Tamayura: Sotsugyō Shashin, was released between April 4, 2015 and April 6, 2016. Two manga adaptations illustrated by Momo have been published by Mag Garden.

Plot
Tamayura centers around a young girl named Fū Sawatari who moves to Takehara, Hiroshima to begin her first year of high school. Her late father grew up in Takehara and this is her first time back in the town in five years. Fū enjoys photography and is often engrossed with taking pictures with her father's old Rollei 35 S film camera. A shy girl, Fū tries her best to make friends early on, spurred on by her childhood friend Kaoru Hanawa. She quickly becomes friends with two other girls, Maon Sakurada and Norie Okazaki. After a year has passed, Fū forms a photography club and meets fellow photographer Kanae Mitani.

Characters

Main characters

A high school girl with a love of photography. She uses a Rollei 35S camera passed on to her by her late father and is particularly interested in finding pictures containing specks of lights which she refers to as 'Tamayura'. She is a little clumsy and often trips and falls while trying to find the perfect shot. She has a habit of adding 'na no de' to her sentences. She especially likes to try to photograph Momoneko, a cat in the neighborhood. Her friends call her  after the noise she makes when she nervously walks.

Fū's childhood friend who used to play with her back when Fū first lived in Takehara. Her reddish-brown hair is styled in a ponytail. She has a self-proclaimed 'smell fetish', taking interest in all sorts of smells, and her hobby is making various blends of pot pourri. She has not decided on that for a career though.

A somewhat quiet girl who prefers to just whistle in her conversations. 

An excitable girl with light brown hair and twin tails. She is infatuated with Fū's little brother, Kou. She enjoys making various sweets and cakes, and thinks about becoming a patissiere.

Introduced in Tamayura: More Aggressive. A local girl who is Fū's senior in high school, who joins her photography club. Like Fū, she also enjoys photography and uses a Pentax Q camera.

Family members

Fū's little brother, who is sometimes mistaken for a girl. He is the one who rekindled Fū's love of photography following their father's death.

Fū and Kou's mother who decided to move to Takehara after Fū expressed a desire to return there. She works in her mother's café, often trying out new recipes.

Fū and Kou's grandmother who runs a café where Fū and her family live.

Fū's father, who died before the start of the story.

Kaoru's older sister and the one who gave Fū her nickname. Her hobby is exploring small, undiscovered places and she often takes Fū and her friends on lengthy trips.

Supporting characters

A professional photographer who took an interest in Fū after she sent her some of her photos. She gave Fū a train ticket with no destination, which is a symbol of the direction one wants to take in life.

Fū's middle school friend during her time in Shioiri, who nicknames her "Fū-nyon". She often makes various stuffed animals and often cries easily. She made the cat shaped camera case that Fū keeps her father's camera in.

The owner of a photo shop who is skilled with cameras and often flirts with female customers.

The owner of the Hoboro okonomiyaki store, who is affectionately known as Hoboro-san. She is quite passionate about making okonomiyaki.

Fū's homeroom teacher who is quite passionate and often makes puns based on place names. He has a crush on Chimo and eventually marries her.

Kou's classmate who has a crush on him, sporting a rivalry against Norie for Kou's affections.

A new teacher at Fū's school who becomes the advisor of her photography club. She is also quite excitable and often tries to get Fū and Kanae to enter various contests.

Chihiro's friend and classmate, who helps her design characters based on her ideas. She speaks in a kansai dialect and gets over-excited when something piques her interest.

A strange, pink, fluffy cat that Fū is always trying to take pictures of, but can never get a good shot.

A freshman who joins the Photography Club in Sotsugyou Shashin. She is rather aggressive and is sometimes invasive with her photography.

Takumi's friend who also joins the Photography Club. She is rather shy.

Media

Manga
A manga adaptation titled Tamayura, illustrated by Momo, was serialized in Mag Garden's online Eden magazine between October 8, 2010 and March 11, 2011. A single tankōbon volume was released on May 14, 2011. A second manga adaptation titled Tamayura: Hitotose, again illustrated by Momo, was serialized in Eden between October 5, 2011 and January 20, 2013. Three volumes were released between February 14, 2012 and February 14, 2013.

Anime

Tamayura was first produced as a four-episode original video animation (OVA) series produced by Hal Film Maker and directed by Junichi Sato. The episodes were released over two Blu-ray Disc (BD) and DVD volumes on November 26 and December 23, 2010. Each episode is about 15 minutes long and is combined in a single video in two parts: the first two episodes in volume one, and the latter two episodes in volume two. The episodes had previously aired on AT-X between September 6 and December 6, 2010.

A 12-episode anime television series based on the OVAs titled  aired in Japan between October 3 and December 19, 2011. The TV series is produced by TYO Animations and directed by Junichi Sato. The TV series is being released on seven BD/DVD compilation volumes between December 21, 2011 and June 27, 2012. A 13th episode for Tamayura: Hitotose, which takes place between episodes five and six, was released on the final BD/DVD volume. Nozomi Entertainment released both the OVA series and Hitotose in North America on October 6, 2015 via distributor Right Stuf Inc.

A 12-episode second season, titled , aired on AT-X between July 3 and September 18, 2013. An OVA episode was released on June 14, 2014. A four-part animated film series, titled , covers the final year of the story. The first of these films was released in Japanese theaters on April 4, 2015, with the second film released on August 29, 2015, the third film released on November 28, 2015, and the fourth and final film released on April 2, 2016.

Music
Opening themes
 by Maaya Sakamoto (OVA)
 by Toshiyuki Mori (Hitotose)
 by Maaya Sakamoto (More Aggressive)

Ending themes
 by Megumi Nakajima (OVA, eps 1-3)
 by Megumi Nakajima (OVA, ep 4)
 by Megumi Nakajima (Hitotose, eps 1, 3-6, 8-10)
 by Megumi Nakajima (Hitotose, ep 2)
 by Megumi Nakajima (Hitotose, ep 7)
 by Ayana Taketatsu, Kana Asumi, Yuko Gibu and Yuka Iguchi (Hitotose, ep 11)
"A Happy New Year" by Maaya Sakamoto (Hitotose, ep 12)
 by Natsumi Kiyoura (Hitotose, ep 5.5)
 by Megumi Nakajima (More Aggressive, ep 1-10)
 by Megumi Nakajima (More Aggressive, ep 11)
 by Haruka Chisuga (More Aggressive, ep 12)

Insert songs
 by Megumi Nakajima (OVA, ep 2-3)
 by Marble (Hitotose, ep 4)
 by Ayana Taketatsu (Hitotose, ep 5)
 by Yuko Gibu and Yuka Iguchi (Hitotose, ep 6)
 by Megumi Nakajima (Hitotose, ep 9)
 by Yukari Fukui (Hitotose, ep 9-10)
 by Kana Asumi (Hitotose, ep 10)
 by Marble (More Aggressive, ep 7)
 by Toshiyuki Mori (More Aggressive, ep 8)
 by Megumi Nakajima (More Aggressive, ep 9)
 by Marble (More Aggressive, ep 10)

References

External links

 Official website 
 

2010 anime OVAs
2010 manga
2011 anime television series debuts
2011 manga
2012 anime OVAs
2015 anime films
Anime with original screenplays
Animated films based on animated series
Animated films based on manga
Hal Film Maker
Iyashikei anime and manga
Mag Garden manga
Manga adapted into films
Shōnen manga
Yumeta Company